Matheus Alessandro dos Santos Pereira (born 10 July 1996) is a Brazilian professional footballer who plays as a winger for Boavista.

Club career
Born in Rio de Janeiro, Alessandro started his youth career with the academy of Xerém. In 2012, he signed for the under-17 team of Fluminense, after impressing the club's scouts during Taça das Favelas. He won the Brasileiro under-20 with the youth side in 2016.

Ahead of the 2017 season, Alessandro was promoted to the senior team. On 27 April 2017, he made his first team debut in a 1–1 draw against Brasil de Pelotas, in Primeira Liga. On 11 May, his contract was extended till 2020. He made his league debut on 3 June, coming on as a substitute for Renato in a 3–1 victory against Vitória. On 4 November, he scored his first goal for the club, scoring the winning goal in a 2–1 triumph over Botafogo.

On 7 January 2019, Alessandro joined Fortaleza on loan for the upcoming season. He went to South Korea on the pause for the 2019 American Cup.

In July 2019, Alessandro joined Daejeon FC on loan for the upcoming season. However it was cancelled due to medical tests.

On 11 September 2021, FC Alashkert announced the signing of Alessandro. 
On 3 January 2022, Boavista announced Alessandro's signing.

Career statistics

Personal life
Alessandro's father represented CR Vasco da Gama as a youth and died when Alessandro was two years old. His uncle, Fernando is a former professional footballer who amongst other clubs played for Vasco da Gama and Flamengo.

References

External links
Matheus Alessandro at Fluminense's website

1996 births
Living people
Footballers from Rio de Janeiro (city)
Brazilian footballers
Association football forwards
Campeonato Brasileiro Série A managers
Fluminense FC players
Fortaleza Esporte Clube players
Brazilian football managers